These are lists of animated television series. Animated television series are television programs produced by means of animation. Animated series produced for theaters are not included in this lists; for those, see List of animated short film series. These lists include compilation series of theatrical shorts such as The Bugs Bunny Show since they often feature some new wrap-around animation.

Lists by decade
List of animated television series of the 1940s and 1950s
List of animated television series of the 1960s
List of animated television series of the 1970s
List of animated television series of the 1980s
List of animated television series of the 1990s
List of animated television series of the 2000s
List of animated television series of the 2010s
List of animated television series of the 2020s

Other lists
List of animated television series created for syndication
List of animated television series by episode count
List of children's animated television series
List of adult animated television series
List of American prime time animated television series
List of anime series by episode count
List of anime franchises by episode count
List of American animated television series
List of Canadian animated television series
List of Chinese animated television series
List of French animated television series
List of Indian animated television series
List of Pakistani animated television series
List of South African animated television series
List of Flash animated television series
List of animated series with LGBTQ characters

External links
 日本のテレビアニメ作品一覧 - Lists of Japanese animated television series on Japanese Wikipedia
 Don Markstein's Toonopedia – Very large index page
 The Big Cartoon Database
 80sCartoons – Nostalgia for those who grew up in the 1980s in the West
 Anime sorted by release date, JP Works DB

 
Lists of television series by genre